Usually characterised by shortened wings, mermithogynes are found in parts of the Formicidae, being queens affected by parasitic nematode worms of the genus Mermis.

See also
Mermithergate
Polymorphism (biology)

References

Further reading 
  (1910): The effects of parasitic and other kinds of castration in insects. Journal of Experimental Zoology 8: 377–438. PDF

Myrmecology